The 2008–09 Washington Capitals season was the team's 35th in the National Hockey League. The Capitals finished the regular season with a record of 50–24–8 and a team-record 108 points, and they won their second consecutive Southeast Division championship. They defeated the New York Rangers in the first round of the 2009 Stanley Cup playoffs 4–3, overcoming a 3–1 series deficit. The Capitals were then defeated by the eventual champion Pittsburgh Penguins in the Eastern Conference Semi-finals in seven games.

Pre-season
Schedule/Results
from capitals.nhl.com

Regular season

Division standings

Conference standings

Schedule and results
Full schedule, results, and recaps at capitals.nhl.com
 Green background indicates win. (2 points) 
 Red indicates loss. (0 points)  
 White background indicates overtime/shootout loss (1 point).

Playoffs

The Washington Capitals won the Southeast Division and qualified for the playoffs for the second straight season. The Capitals would eventually win the first round against the New York Rangers, in seven games, after trailing the series 3–1 for their first playoff series victory since reaching the Stanley Cup Final in 1998.  However, the Capitals would not get past the Pittsburgh Penguins and lost the series in seven games.

Key:  Win  Loss  Clinch Playoff Series  Eliminated from playoffs

Player statistics

Skaters

Goaltenders

†Denotes player spent time with another team before joining Capitals. Stats reflect time with the Capitals only.
‡Traded mid-season
Bold/italics denotes franchise record

Awards and records

Trophies and awards
 Alexander Ovechkin – Hart Memorial Trophy (Most Valuable Player)
 Alexander Ovechkin – Lester B. Pearson Award (Most Outstanding Player)
 Alexander Ovechkin – Maurice "Rocket" Richard Trophy: (56 goals)
 Alexander Ovechkin – Kharlamov Trophy
 Alexander Ovechkin – NHL First All-Star Team
 Mike Green – NHL First All-Star Team

Stars
 Alexander Semin – NHL No. 1 Star of the Month (October 2008)
 Alex Ovechkin – NHL No. 1 Star of the Month (November 2008)
 Nicklas Backstrom – NHL No. 1 Star of the Week (Week Ending November 28, 2008)
 Alex Ovechkin – NHL No. 1 Star of the Week (Week Ending December 28, 2008)
 Mike Green – NHL No. 3 Star of the Week (Week Ending February 1, 2009)
 Mike Green – NHL No. 3 Star of the Week (Week Ending February 8, 2009)

Records
 Mike Green – NHL-record 8-game goal-scoring streak by a defenseman

Milestones

Transactions

Trades

Free agents

Claimed from waivers

Draft picks
Washington 's picks at the 2008 NHL Entry Draft in Ottawa, Ontario.

See also
 2008–09 NHL season
 Brett Leonhardt

Farm teams

Hershey Bears of the American Hockey League (AHL) and the South Carolina Stingrays of the ECHL.

References

Washington Capitals seasons
W
W
Cap
Cap